The 21st GLAAD Media Awards was the 2010 annual presentation of the media awards presented by the Gay & Lesbian Alliance Against Defamation. The awards seek to honor films, television shows, musicians and works of journalism that fairly and accurately represent the LGBT community and issues relevant to the community. The 21st annual award ceremony included 116 nominees in 24 English-language categories, and 36 Spanish-language nominees in eight categories.

The awards were presented in three separate shows: one in New York City on March 13, one in Los Angeles on April 18, and one in San Francisco on June 5. The Los Angeles event was hosted by Candis Cayne and Wilson Cruz. Alan Cumming hosted the New York awards, and Bruce Vilanch hosted the San Francisco event. Additional guests and presenters included Elizabeth Keener, Tom Ford, Benjamin Bratt and Rob Halford.

Comedian Wanda Sykes received the Stephen F. Kolzak Award, which is presented to an openly gay media professional who has made a difference promoting and advancing equal rights in the community. Sykes publicly came out in 2008 at a Las Vegas rally. She said of receiving the award, "I greatly appreciate the work that GLAAD continues to do, promoting equality, fair representation and tolerance for our LGBT community. I just pray that I don't ruin what GLAAD has achieved with all of my shenanigans."

Actress Drew Barrymore received the Vanguard Award, which is presented to media professionals who have increased the visibility and understanding of the gay community. Barrymore was selected for her portrayal of a lesbian daughter of a widower in the film Everybody's Fine, as well as her vocal support for same sex marriage. Barrymore said, "I was born, bred and raised among diversity, it has defined me and made me the person I am today. I'm honored and humbled to be receiving this award." Actress Cynthia Nixon also received the Vito Russo Award, and the musical Hair received a special recognition.

Nominees

Winning nominees are indicated by bold text.

Outstanding Film – Wide Release
 Everybody's Fine – Miramax Films
 I Love You, Man – DreamWorks
 Precious: Based on the Novel "Push" by Sapphire – Lions Gate Entertainment
 A Single Man – The Weinstein Company Taking Woodstock – Focus FeaturesOutstanding Film – Limited Release Casi Divas – Maya Entertainment
 The Country Teacher – Film Movement
 Little Ashes – Regent Releasing Phoebe in Wonderland – THINKFilm
 The Secrets – Monterey MediaOutstanding Drama Series Brothers & Sisters – ABC Grey's Anatomy – ABC
 Mad Men – AMC
 Skins – BBC America
 True Blood – HBOOutstanding Comedy Series Beautiful People – Logo
 Glee – Fox Greek – ABC Family
 Modern Family – ABC
 United States of Tara – ShowtimeOutstanding Individual Episode (in a series without a regular LGBT character) "Homeward Bound", Private Practice – ABC
 "Lisa Says", The Listener – NBC
 "Pawnee Zoo", Parks and Recreation – NBC "The Real Ghostbusters", Supernatural – The CW
 "Wait and See", Private Practice – ABCOutstanding TV Movie or Mini-Series An Englishman in New York – Logo
 Pedro – MTV
 Prayers for Bobby – Lifetime Children of Earth – BBC AmericaOutstanding Documentary Ask Not – PBS Be Like Others – HBO
 Derek – Sundance Channel
 The Topp Twins: Untouchable Girls – Diva Productions
 U People – Logo/VH1Outstanding Reality Program The Amazing Race 15 – CBS
 Kathy Griffin: My Life on the D-List – Bravo
 Making His Band – MTV
 The Real World: Brooklyn – MTV
 RuPaul's Drag Race – Logo/VH1Outstanding Daily Drama All My Children – ABC
 As the World Turns – CBS
 Guiding Light – CBS
 One Life to Live – ABCOutstanding Music Artist Brandi Carlile – Give Up the Ghost (Sony Music Entertainment)
 Lady Gaga – The Fame Monster (Interscope Records) Gossip – Music for Men (Sony Music Entertainment)
 Adam Lambert – For Your Entertainment (19 Recordings/RCA Records)
 Otep – Smash the Control Machine (Victory Records)Outstanding Talk Show Episode "Ellen DeGeneres and Her Wife, Portia de Rossi" – The Oprah Winfrey Show (syndicated) "Hell to Pay – Gay Teen Exorcism" – The Tyra Banks Show (The CW)
 "Mormon Church & Gays" – The Joy Behar Show (HLN)
 "The Science of Intersex" – The Dr. Oz Show (syndicated)
 "Sirdeaner Walker Interview" – The Ellen DeGeneres Show (syndicated)Outstanding TV Journalism – Newsmagazine "40th Anniversary of Stonewall" – In the Life (PBS)
 "Angie Zapata Murder Trial" – InSession (truTV)
 "Bullied to Death?" – Anderson Cooper 360° (CNN)
 "Gay Killings in Iraq" – CNN Newsroom (CNN)
 "Uganda Be Kidding Me" – The Rachel Maddow Show (MSNBC)Outstanding TV Journalism Segment "Gay Teen Mutilated" – Issues with Jane Velez-Mitchell (HLN)
 "Lt. Col. Victor Fehrenbach 'I Was Utterly Devastated'" – CNN Newsroom (CNN)
 "Reverend's Revelation: Minister Speaks Out About Being Transgender" – The Early Show (CBS)
 "Total Transformation: Why Chaz Bono Decided to Change" – Good Morning America (ABC)
 "Why Will Won't Pledge Allegiance" – American Morning (CNN)Outstanding Newspaper Article "Binational, Same-Sex Couples Face Immigration Problems" – Mike Swift (San Jose Mercury News)
 "Kept From a Dying Partner's Bedside" – Tara Parker-Pope (The New York Times) "Militias Target Some Iraqis for Being Gay" – Paul Wiseman and Nadeem Majeed (USA Today)
 "Minister Kept Secret for 27 Years" – Christine McFadden (Portland Tribune)
 "Transgender Vets a Hidden Population" – Carol Ann Alaimo (Arizona Daily Star)Outstanding Newspaper Columnist Leonard Pitts – The Miami Herald
 Deb Price – The Detroit News
 Frank Rich – The New York Times
 Rev. Byron Williams – The Oakland Tribune
 Craig Wilson – USA Today

Outstanding Newspaper Overall Coverage
 Greeley Tribune
 Los Angeles Times
 The New York Times
 Portland Press Herald
 The Washington Post

Outstanding Magazine Article
 "Coming Out in Middle School" – Benoit Denizet-Lewis (The New York Times Magazine)
 "Either/Or: Sports, Sex and the Case of Caster Semenya" – Ariel Levy (The New Yorker)
 "Gay on Trial" – Gabriel Arana (The American Prospect)
 "Trouble in Paradise" – Jeannine Amber (Essence)
 "What's Right with Utah" – Lisa Duggan (The Nation)

Outstanding Magazine Overall Coverage
 The Advocate
 Entertainment Weekly
 The Nation
 Newsweek
 People

Outstanding Digital Journalism Article
 "Former College Football Captain Was Openly Gay" – Cyd Zeigler, Jr. (Outsports.com)
 "McMackin's Slur Reveals Larger Problem" – LZ Granderson (ESPN.com)
 "On the Road to Refuge" – Pete Muller (ColorLines.com)
 "'We Love You, This Won't Change a Thing'" – John Buccigross (ESPN.com)
 "Why Can't You Just Butch Up? Gay Men, Effeminacy, and Our War with Ourselves" – Brent Hartinger (AfterElton.com)

Outstanding Digital Journalism – Multimedia
 "AIDS Lifecycle: On the Road" – Derrick Shore (Advocate.com)
 "From Stonewall to Mainstream" – Jessica Bennett and Rebecca Shabad, photos by Kathy Jones and Margaret Keady, video by Jennifer Molina (Newsweek.com)
 "The Stonewall Riots: 40 Years Later" – Dave Singleton (AARP.org)

Outstanding Comic Book
 Buffy the Vampire Slayer – Jane Espenson, Steven S. DeKnight, Drew Greenberg, Jim Krueger, Doug Petrie, Joss Whedon (Dark Horse Comics)
 Detective Comics by Greg Rucka (DC Comics)
 Madame Xanadu – Matt Wagner (Vertigo/DC Comics)
 Secret Six – Gail Simone (DC Comics)
 X-Factor – Peter David (Marvel Comics)

Outstanding Los Angeles Theater
 40 is the New 15 – book and lyrics by Larry Todd Johnson, music by Cindy O'Connor
 Anita Bryant Died for Your Sins – Brian Christopher Williams
 Battle Hymn – Jim Leonard
 Bingo with the Indians by Adam Rapp
 Lydia by Octavio Solis

Outstanding New York Theater: Broadway & Off-Broadway
 A Boy and His Soul – Colman Domingo
 The Brother/Sister Plays – Tarell Alvin McCraney
 Next Fall – Geoffrey Nauffts
 Soul Samurai – Qui Nguyen
 The Temperamentals – Jon Marans

Outstanding New York Theater: Off-Off Broadway
 Abraham Lincoln's Big Gay Dance Party – Aaron Loeb
 Devil Boys From Beyond – Buddy Thomas and Kenneth Elliott
 The Lily's Revenge – Taylor Mac
 She Like Girls – Chisa Hutchinson
 Wickets – Clove Galilee and Jenny Rogers, adapted from Fefu and Her Friends by María Irene Fornés

References

21st
GLAAD
2010 in California
2010 in LGBT history
2010 in New York City
2010 in Los Angeles
2010 in San Francisco
Lists of LGBT-related award winners and nominees